Bruno Souza may refer to:
Bruno Fernandes de Souza (born 1984), Brazilian footballer
Bruno Souza (architect) (born 1925), Indian architect
Bruno Souza (handballer) (born 1977), Brazilian handballer
Bruno Souza (programmer), Brazilian Java programmer